Lauth is a surname. Notable people with the surname include:

Benjamin Lauth (born 1981), German footballer
Bernard Lauth (1820–1894), American steel industry businessman
Ernest Alexandre Lauth (1803–1837), French anatomist
Franz Joseph Lauth (1822–1895), German Egyptologist
Frieda Lauth (1879–1949), South African botanical artist
Thomas Lauth (1758–1826), French anatomist

See also
Lauth (Königsberg), a former quarter of Königsberg, Prussia